The Constitution of Nigeria is the written supreme law of the Federal Republic of Nigeria. Nigeria has had many constitutions. Its current form was enacted on 29 May 1999 and inaugurated the Fourth Nigerian Republic.

Nigeria constitution 
Nigeria's structure and composition are a legacy of British colonial rule. It has over 374 multilingual groups with different cultures and traditions. This diversity contributes to Nigeria being "one of the world's most deeply divided countries" with rampant political corruption. As a result, Nigeria has undergone many attempts to form an effective constitution. These efforts include civilian and military rule, centrifugal and centralized federalism, presidential and parliamentary systems, and other political institutions.

An Order in Council enacted Nigeria's first constitutions during the colonial era when the country was administered as a Crown Colony. These constitutions include the Clifford Constitution of 1922, the Richards Constitution of 1946, the Macpherson Constitution of 1951, and the Lyttleton Constitution of 1954.

Richards constitution 
Westminster approved a new constitution for Nigeria in 1946. It was called the Richards Constitution after Governor-General Sir Arthur Richards, who was responsible for its formulation. Although it left effective power in the hands of the Governor-General and his appointed Executive Council, it also established an expanded Legislative Council empowered to deliberate on matters affecting the country. It also created three regional Houses of Assembly to consider local questions and advise the lieutenant governors. 

The Richards Constitution recognized the country's diversity by introducing  the federal principle with its regional authority. Although realistic in its assessment of the situation in Nigeria, the Richards Constitution intensified regionalism instead of encouraging political unification. It was suspended in 1950 against a call for greater autonomy.

Macpherson constitution 
An inter-parliamentary conference at Ibadan in 1950 drafted a new constitution. It was dubbed the Macpherson Constitution after the incumbent Governor-General John Stuart Macpherson. It went into effect the following year, in 1951.

The Macpherson Constitution provided for regional autonomy and federal union, creating a central government with a Council of Ministers. This encouraged political participation and party activity at the national level. However, the regional governments had broad legislative powers that could not be overridden by the newly established 185-seat federal House of Representatives. As a result, the Macpherson Constitution significantly boosted regionalism.

Lyttleton constitution 
The next revision of the constitution was called the Lyttleton Constitution after Oliver Lyttelton, 1st Viscount Chandos. It was enacted in 1954 and firmly established the federal principle. This paved the way for Nigeria's independence from Great Britain.

1960 independence constitution
A British Order-in-Council enacted Nigeria's first constitution as a sovereign state. It came into force upon the country's independence on 1 October 1960. Under this constitution, Nigeria retained Queen Elizabeth II as titular head of state, Queen of Nigeria. Nnamdi Azikiwe represented the queen as Governor-General.

1963 constitution
Independent Nigeria's second constitution abolished the monarchy and established the First Nigerian Republic. It came into force on 1 October 1963, the third anniversary of Nigeria's independence. Nnamdi Azikiwe became the first President of Nigeria. The 1963 constitution was based on the Westminster system. It was used until a military coup in 1966 that overthrew Nigeria's democratic institutions.

1979 constitution
The 1979 constitution established the Second Nigerian Republic. It abandoned the Westminster system in favour of a United States-style presidential system with direct elections. To avoid the pitfalls of the First Nigerian Republic, the 1979 constitution mandated political parties which were required to register in at least two-thirds of the states. In addition, it established a Cabinet of Nigeria, with each state having at least one member. This gave a "federal character" to the nation.

1993 constitution
The 1993 constitution established the Third Nigerian Republic. This constitution was supposed to return democratic rule to Nigeria but was never fully implemented. The military controlled the country until 1999.

Constitution of the Federal Republic of Nigeria
The 1999 constitution created the Fourth Nigerian Republic, a federation with democratic rule. It remains in force today. 

The 1999 constitution identifies the national capital, 36 states and their capitals, and 774 local government areas within Nigeria. It establishes the legislative, executive, and judicial branches of government and details their duties and the separation of powers between the branches and federal and state governments. Nigeria's legislative powers are vested in a National Assembly with two chambers: a Senate and a House of Representatives. The constitution gives the National Assembly the power to make laws for "peace, order and good government of the Federation".

In addition, the constitution outlines the individual's fundamental rights, including life, liberty, dignity, privacy, freedom of expression, religious freedom, and security from slavery, violence, discrimination, and forced service in the military. It also defines a person's right to a timely and fair trial if arrested and the presumption of innocence. Nigerians also have the right to own land, a right of assembly, and freedom of movement.

The constitution also protects four laws: the Land Use Act, the National Securities Agencies Act, the National Youth Service legislation, and the Public Complaints Commission Act. In January 2011, President Goodluck Jonathan signed two amendments to the constitution, the first modifications since it came into use in 1999.

See also

Military dictatorship in Nigeria –  1966–1979 and 1983–1999

References

External links

Nigeria
Constitution of Nigeria
Law of Nigeria
1999 in Nigeria